Annelles is a commune in the Ardennes department in the Grand Est region of northern France.

The inhabitants of the commune are known as Annellois or Annelloises

Geography
Annelles is located some 10 km south-east of Rethel and 4 km north-east of Juniville. It can be accessed by the D25 road from Juniville which passes through the heart of the commune and the village and continues to Saulces-Champenoises in the north-east. Apart from the village the commune is entirely farmland.

Neighbouring communes and villages

Heraldry

Administration

List of Successive Mayors

Population

Culture and heritage

Religious heritage
The Church contains 3 Paintings: The Descent from the Cross, Christ and the Samaritan, and the Apparition of Madeleine (18th century) which are registered as historical objects.

The oldest families
From the 1600s onwards the most prominent families were: Rogelet, Mahaut, Desterbay, Thierard, Vuibert, Hinguerlot, Guillet, Micart, Carrelot, Bonnevie, Perinet, Detez, Coutin, Fricoteau, Tocut, Giot, Forest, Verdelet, Lacour, Misset, Bechard, Mayot, Fequant, Lambert, Guillemin, Prévoteau, Soibinet, Simon, Melin, and Gobron.

Notable people linked to the commune
Jeanne Alexzandrine Pommery, born at Annelles on 13 April 1819 and died at Chigny-les-Roses (Marne) on 18 March 1890 was the founder of the House of Pommery, makers of Champagne wines.

See also
Communes of the Ardennes department

References

External links
Annelles on the old National Geographic Institute website 
Annelles on Géoportail, National Geographic Institute (IGN) website 
Annelle on the 1750 Cassini Map

Communes of Ardennes (department)